The Burger Baron name is used by several fast-food restaurants in western Canada.

History 

Founded in 1957 in either Calgary or Lethbridge, Alberta (the location and ownership of the first site is disputed), Burger Baron was the first drive-in chain in Western Canada. The company expanded quickly throughout the region but suffered when the big American chains began to move to the area. The original franchise operation collapsed into bankruptcy and current restaurants are independently operated, with different menus, recipes, signage and advertising. Today, there are still dozens of Burger Barons throughout Western Canada, but they are mostly concentrated around Edmonton and in small towns in Alberta. Many of the owners are Lebanese Canadians, connected to Rudy Kemaldean of Edmonton, who bought the first of his seven restaurants in 1965, hired family and friends and encouraged them to open their own operations under the Burger Baron name. 

Among other things, Burger Baron is famous for being endorsed by former Edmonton Oilers hockey coach Glen Sather and other former members of the Edmonton Oilers.

Several Burger Baron buildings formerly belonged to other chains. Five of them were part of the local Burger King chain, once Burger Baron's main rival, which became defunct when the worldwide Burger King company acquired the rights to the name for northern Alberta in 1995. The local Burger King chain had previously held franchising rights to Kentucky Fried Chicken, and had buildings in the then-standard KFC design. The Burger Baron on 111 Avenue 95 Street used to be owned by Wes Kemaldean formerly housed the Burger King headquarters along with a Burger King/Kentucky Fried Chicken outlet.

An attempt in the 1980s to return to a franchise system ended when independent owners were unable to reach agreement. A legal dispute over the trademark between family members of early owners was settled in the 1990s.

Products
Burger Baron's typically provide multiple variations of Burgers, such as a "Salisbury Burger", and the "Pizza Burger".  The mushroom Burger is Burger Baron's most popular. In recent years one of the chain's main features has been Halifax-style donairs, available only in certain locations.

Locations

Caroline
Carstairs
Bonnyville
Drayton Valley
Edmonton (4)
Hanna
High Prairie
Kelowna, BC
Lac La Biche
Lacombe
Lamont
Leduc
Maskwacis
Mayerthorpe
Onoway
Prince Albert
Raymond
Redwater
Rocky Mountain House
St. Paul
Sundre
Swan Hills
Tofield
Valleyview
Wabasca
Wainwright
Whitecourt

See also
 List of hamburger restaurants

References

Further reading
 "The Baron von Burgher leads an attack on our appetites", Vue Weekly, May 4, 2006
 "The Last Baron" (video), Absolutely Canadian, CBC Gem
 "The Mystery of the Lebanese Mushroom Burger", Quench Magazine, May 11, 2022

Fast-food chains of Canada
Regional restaurant chains in Canada
Fast-food hamburger restaurants
Restaurants established in 1957
Companies based in Lethbridge
Food and drink companies based in Alberta
Cuisine of Western Canada
Restaurants in Alberta
1957 establishments in Alberta